Escape from Earth: New Adventures in Space  is an anthology of original science fiction novellas edited by American writers Jack Dann and Gardner Dozois, published in 2006.

Contents

The book includes 7 novellas, all commissioned for this book and published here for the first time. The stories are as follows.
Allen Steele: "Escape from Earth"
Kage Baker: "Where the Golden Apples Grow"
Geoffrey A. Landis: "Derelict"
Orson Scott Card: "Space Boy"
Walter Jon Williams: "Incarnation Day"
Elizabeth Moon: "Combat Shopping"
Joe Haldeman: "The Mars Girl"

1990 anthologies
Science fiction anthologies
Science Fiction Book Club original anthologies
Jack Dann and Gardner Dozois Ace anthologies